Kamle district, also Khamle, is one of the 25 administrative districts (26th including Itanagar capital complex) of Arunachal Pradesh in northeastern India. The district headquarters are at Raga. 

Kamle got its name from the river Kamle. River Kamle joins the Subansiri river which finally meets the Brahmaputra in Assam.

History 
Demands for the creation of this district have been made at least since December 2013 when the All Nyishi Youth Association (ANYA) threatened a Bandh, and the state government gave a written assurance that it would speed up the creation of Pakke-Kessang and Kamle districts. The main inhabitants are the Nyishi. On 15 December 2017 Chief Minister Pema Khandu officially inaugurated the district.

Geography 
Kamle district has been formed from administration circles from Lower Subansiri district and three from Upper Subansiri district. The district has 6 administrative units: Raga, Kamporijo, Dollungmukh, Puchi-Geko, Gepen, and a portion of Daporijo Sadar circles consisting of all villages which fall under Raga assembly including Ligu and Liruk which were under the administrative control of Upper Subansiri district). The district has one assembly constituency - Raga.

References

External links 

Districts of Arunachal Pradesh
Kamle district